Per Wilhelm Palmroth (1765–1825) was a Swedish architect who worked in the Stockholm superintendent's office.

He is known for his numerous churches, which Palmroth designed in various parts of Sweden and Finland. His most famous works are the tower of Kungsholm Church in Stockholm and Kuopio Cathedral.

Work in Finland 

 Kauvatsa's old church (1797, demolished 1879)
 Pomarkku's old wooden church (1802), built as a copy of Kauvatsa's old church
 Piikkiö church bell tower (1810)
 Kuopio Cathedral (1816)

References 

1765 births
1825 deaths
Swedish architects